Wacky Races is an American animated television series developed by Rebecca Himot and Tramm Wigzell. It is a reboot/revival of the 1968–69 Hanna-Barbera animated series of the same name. The show debuted in 2017 on Boomerang's video on demand service in the United States. Wacky Races was picked up for a second season.

Summary 
The series features the return of some of the characters from the original Wacky Races program: Dick Dastardly, Muttley, Penelope Pitstop, Peter Perfect and the Gruesome Twosome. More than half of the original characters do not return. Several new characters were introduced, including I. Q. Ickly, Brick Crashman, P. T. Barnstorm, and Pandora Pitstop.

While the reboot is based on the original series, it also focuses on the Racers' personal lives; storylines are added and there usually is no actual winner or loser at the end of each race. There is also meta-humor and fourth wall breaking.

Characters

Main 
 Dick Dastardly the Third and Muttley (voiced by Peter Woodward and Billy West): In this modern series, Dick Dastardly is still up to his usual trickery and cheating activities, though is now often badgered into either being nice or not cheating by Peter Perfect. Unlike before, his appearance is predominantly purple in color instead of blue, red and purple. Muttley, however, has undergone virtually no changes aside from his outward appearance, still either snickering or grumbling. In "Mother Knows Best", it is revealed that Dick Dastardly is actually the son/descendant of Dick Dastardly the Second, the  original Dick Dastardly from the original Wacky Races series, who is also the husband of Delilah Dastardly, who taught Dick Dastardly the Third, her own son, how to cheat. However, in "Grandfather Knows Dast", his grandfather is actually revealed to be Dick Dastardly the First, the original Dick Dastardly from the original Dastardly and Muttley in Their Flying Machines series who's also the father of Dick Dastardly the Second, the original Dick Dastardly from the original Wacky Races series.
 Penelope Pitstop (voiced by Nicole Parker): Another original character, Penelope Pitstop has undergone the most changes from the original, both in appearance and outlook. While more assertive and much less of a damsel in distress than the original, she is still often the goody-two-shoes of the group and still talks like a Southern belle. Like before, her appearance is predominantly pink with hearts.
 Peter Perfect (voiced by Diedrich Bader): Like Dastardly and Muttley, largely unchanged from the original, although he is a bit more taunting of Dastardly than before. His appearance is predominantly orange and red.
 Tiny and Bella – the Gruesome Twosome (voiced by Billy West and Tom Kenny) are the other characters from the original series, and are the closest to their original versions in almost every respect.
 Ignatius Quinton "I. Q." Ickly (voiced by Jill Talley): A new character who is often called a "walking encyclopaedia" by Dastardly and has little social capability. Like Professor Pat Pending before him, he is a genius with a large amount of inventions that he uses throughout the race. As he is only 10 years old he does not actually drive, his car drives itself due to it being a sentient AI.

Secondary

Racers 
 Pandora Pitstop (voiced by Nicole Parker): A new character. Penelope's twin sister and frequent guest Racer. She is similar to Penelope, except her outfit is predominantly purple and is often meaner and more underhanded than even Dastardly is. She often allies with Dastardly, but usually for her own ends.
 Captain Dash, Polly, Bugsy, Bluebeard and Davey Bones (voiced by Billy West and Tom Kenny): A gang of pirates that often steal gigs from Dastardly.

Non-racers
 Brick Crashman (voiced by Christopher Judge): The announcer for the Wacky Races.
 P. T. Barnstorm (voiced by Jill Talley): The owner and sponsor for the Wacky Races.

Guest stars
 Hooded Claw (voiced by Tom Kenny impersonating Paul Lynde)
 Huckleberry Hound (voiced by Billy West): a guest racer and Peter Perfect's stunt double
 Snagglepuss (voiced by Billy West and Tom Kenny)
 Hong Kong Phooey (voiced by Phil LaMarr)
 Quick Draw McGraw (voiced by Billy West)
 Touché Turtle (voiced by Billy West): a guest racer
 Ricochet Rabbit (voiced by Tom Kenny): a guest racer.
 The Dalton Brothers
 Dinky Dalton (voiced by Christopher Judge)
 Finky Dalton (voiced by Tom Kenny)
 Pinky Dalton (voiced by Diedrich Bader)
 Stinky Dalton (voiced by Billy West)
 Winsome Witch (voiced by Nicole Parker): a guest racer.
 Mildew Wolf
 Magilla Gorilla
 Scooby-Doo
 Scrappy-Doo (voiced by Tom Kenny): Scooby-Doo's nephew 
 Mr. Jinks (voiced by Billy West)
 Jabberjaw (voiced by Billy West)
 Chief (voiced by Billy West)
 Top Cat
 Benny the Ball

Episodes

Broadcast 
Wacky Races premiered internationally in 2017. The first episode was released on Boomerang's SVOD service in the United States on August 14, 2017. The other 11 episodes were released on August 31, 2017.

The series was first shown on television in the United States on the Boomerang channel, with the episode "Under the Rainbow" airing on Boomerang as a preview on February 22, 2018, and the series officially premiering on the Boomerang channel on May 21, 2018, alongside another show from Boomerang's SVOD service, Dorothy and the Wizard of Oz.

The series aired as a repeat on Cartoon Network on August 13, 2018.

Home video 
Start Your Engines!, a DVD release containing the first 10 episodes of the series, was released on April 24, 2018.

See also

References

External links 
 

2017 American television series debuts
2019 American television series endings
2010s American animated television series
American children's animated action television series
American children's animated comedy television series
American children's animated fantasy television series
American children's animated sports television series
Animated television series about dogs
Animated television series about auto racing
Automotive television series
English-language television shows
Television series by Warner Bros. Animation
Animated television series reboots
Boomerang (TV network) original programming
Wacky Races
Wacky Races spin-offs